Muricanthus nigritus, the Northern Radix or Black-and-White Murex or Black Murex, is a species of sea snail, a marine gastropod mollusc in the family Muricidae, the murex snails or rock snails. It is commonly known as the black murex shell.

Distribution
The black murex shell is commonly found in the Gulf of California (Sea of Cortez), in the Western Mexico.

Habitat
These sea snails can be found in the intertidal and subtidal waters, with sand and gravel substrate, at depths up to 60 m.

Description
These large shells are black and white with black or dark brown stripes. The shell surface bears short spikes around the body whorl and spire. The aperture is porcelaneous white.

This species is quite similar to Hexaplex radix. The shells of these two species mainly differ in the length, width and in the proportion of black versus white. Moreover, shells of H. nigritus are more oblong  and show more spines in black.

Biology
These sea snails feed primarily on clams.

References

Bibliography
 A. P. H. Oliver, James Nicholls - Hamlyn Guide to Shells of the World
 Angeline Myra Keen - Sea Shells of Tropical West America
 B. Garrigues, J-P. Pointier D. Merle - Fossil and Recent Muricidae of the World
 Jerome M. Eisenberg - Collector's guide to Seashells of the World
 Merle D., Garrigues B. & Pointier J.-P. (2011) Fossil and Recent Muricidae of the world. Part Muricinae. Hackenheim: Conchbooks. 648 pp.
  Houart, R. & Wiedrick, S.G. (2021). Review of Muricanthus Swainson, 1840 and some Recent species assigned to Hexaplex s.s. Perry, 1810, Hexaplex (Trunculariopsis) Cossmann, 1921 and Phyllonotus Swainson, 1833. Novapex. 22(1-2): 25-42.

External links
  Mörch, O. A. L. (1852-1853). Catalogus conchyliorum quae reliquit D. Alphonso d'Aguirra & Gadea Comes de Yoldi, Regis Daniae Cubiculariorum Princeps, Ordinis Dannebrogici in Prima Classe & Ordinis Caroli Tertii Eques. Fasc. 1, Cephalophora, 170 pp. (1852) Fasc. 2, Acephala, Annulata, Cirripedia, Echinodermata, 74 [+2] pp. [1853]. Hafniae (Copenhagen): L. Klein]
 Philippi, R. A. (1842-1850). Abbildungen und Beschreibungen neuer oder wenig gekannter Conchylien unter Mithülfe meherer deutscher Conchyliologen. Cassel, T. Fischer

Muricidae
Gastropods described in 1845
Taxa named by Rodolfo Amando Philippi